BlackRock Throgmorton Trust is a large British investment trust dedicated to small and mid-sized company investments. Established as The Throgmorton Trust in December 1962, the company owned, in the early 1980s, a subsidiary known as Capital for Industry which acquired majority interests in consumer businesses such as Morphy Richards. The fund has been managed by BlackRock since July 2008 and the chairman is Chris Samuel. It is listed on the London Stock Exchange and is a constituent of the FTSE 250 Index.

References

External links
 Official site

Financial services companies established in 1962
Investment trusts of the United Kingdom
Companies listed on the London Stock Exchange
British companies established in 1962